Mary Black, née Childs (7 April 1922 – 1992), was an American art historian.

Life
Mary Black was born on 17 April 1922 in Pittsfield, Massachusetts. She was awarded her B.A. from the University of North Carolina in 1943 and joined the United States Navy's WAVES that same year. Promoted to lieutenant, junior grade, she remained in the Navy until 1946. She married Richard Winthrop Black on 7 April 1947 and received a M.A. degree from George Washington University four years later. She was employed as a research assistant at Colonial Williamsburg at Williamsburg, Virginia in 1956–57 and then became registrar for the Abby Aldrich Rockefeller Folk Art Collection at Williamsburg in 1957–58, curator from 1958 to 1960, and then director and curator in 1960–63. Black was the director of the American Folk Art Museum from 1964 to 1969 and then became curator of painting, sculpture, and decorative arts for the New-York Historical Society in New York City. She was divorced in 1970 and remained with the Historical Society until her dismissal a dozen years later. Black filed complaints with state and federal agencies alleging sex and age discrimination and the society settled. She was awarded back pay, including vacation time, and a full pension. She died of cancer in Germantown, New York in 1992 at age 69.

Activities
Mary Black published five books in her career and contributed to "a number of publications for the New-York Historical Society on various topics, including Edward Hicks, Erastus Salisbury Field, aspects of Jewish life in New York, Dutch paintings, advertising posters, Federal furniture and decorative arts, and Belmont Park." Her research led to the identification of bodies of work for the painters Nehemiah Partridge and Jacob Maentel.

Notes

References

1922 births
1992 deaths
University of North Carolina alumni
George Washington University alumni
American art historians
American women historians
Female United States Navy officers
Women art historians
20th-century American historians
20th-century American women writers
Writers from Pittsfield, Massachusetts
Historians from Massachusetts
Colonial Williamsburg
New-York Historical Society
WAVES personnel
American women curators
American curators